Penares is a widely distributed genus of demosponges.

Description 
These sponges are irregularly massive and have a thin cortex. Species belonging to this genus have dichotriaenes (spicules with pairs of branched rays) and oxeas (needle-like spicules with both ends pointed). Smooth microrhabds (modified microxeas (small oxeas) or microstrongyles (small rods with both ends blunt or rounded)) form a crust in the ectosome. Euasters (star-shaped microscleres with multiple rays radiating from a central point) may also be present.

Species 
The following species are recognised:

References 

Demospongiae
Sponge genera